Estradiol valerate/methenmadinone caproate (EV/MMC), known by the tentative brand name Lutofollin, is a combination medication of estradiol valerate (EV), an estrogen, and methenmadinone caproate (MMC; superlutin caproate), a progestin, which was developed for potential use as a once-a-month combined injectable contraceptive but was never marketed. It contained 10 mg EV and 60 mg MMC in 1 mL oil solution and was intended for administration by intramuscular injection once every 4 weeks.

See also
 List of combined sex-hormonal preparations § Estrogens and progestogens

References

Abandoned drugs
Combined estrogen–progestogen formulations
Combined injectable contraceptives